Ciechowice  is a village in the administrative district of Gmina Nędza, within Racibórz County, Silesian Voivodeship, in southern Poland.

The village has a population of 483.

References

Ciechowice